Crispin Freeman is an American voice actor, voice director, and screenwriter who is best known for voicing characters in English-language dubs of Japanese anime, animation, and video games. Some of his prominent anime roles include Zelgadis Graywords in Slayers, Kyon in The Melancholy of Haruhi Suzumiya, Togusa in the Ghost in the Shell franchise, Alucard in Hellsing, Kirei Kotomine in Fate/Zero and Fate/stay night: Unlimited Blade Works, Itachi Uchiha in Naruto, Gyomei Himejima in Demon Slayer: Kimetsu no Yaiba, Hagi in Blood+ and Shizuo Heiwajima in Durarara!!

Early life

Freeman was born in Chicago  His father is Jewish. He is the oldest of three children. His sister, Cassidy Freeman is an actress, while his brother Clark is an actor and musician. Freeman graduated from the Latin School of Chicago in 1990 and earned a BA from Williams College, where he majored in theater and minored in computer science. He then earned an MFA in acting from Columbia University and went on to perform on Broadway, at the American Repertory Theater, at the Mark Taper Forum, at Cincinnati's Playhouse in the Park, and at the Williamstown Theater Festival. As a child, he was greatly influenced by anime such as Speed Racer and Battle of the Planets. Casey Kasem voiced the role of his favorite character, Mark of Battle of the Planets, and Freeman even wanted to change his name to Mark at one point. He later discovered Voltron, Star Blazers, and Robotech. He has also stated that the reason he got into the industry was because of the anime The Vision of Escaflowne. He initially got involved in the voice-over industry when a friend of his landed a role in Peacock King.

Career

Knowing Freeman was a big anime fan, a friend suggested he call up Central Park Media (CPM) and apply for a job doing English dubs. When originally approached about dubbing, he initially declined. It was not until he remembered all of the anime shows he watched as a child that he realized that many people are introduced to anime through the English dubbed versions. In 1997, Freeman landed the role of Zelgadis Graywords in Slayers along with Lisa Ortiz, Eric Stuart and Veronica Taylor. He was the second and final voice actor to get the job, after Zelgadis' original voice actor, Daniel Cronin, lost contact with CPM after a year-long halt in the dubbing. Years later he turned to the American animation voice acting grounds.

Freeman has been best known for his work in Marvel Comics based productions such as The Spectacular Spider-Man, Wolverine and the X-Men and The Avengers: Earth's Mightiest Heroes. He then starred as several versions of Roy Harper in Young Justice for DC Comics and Warner Bros. Since then, Freeman has had various roles throughout his career. He has appeared in many video game titles as memorable characters, such as Albedo from Namco's Xenosaga series, the god of the sun Helios in God of War III, Haji, Joel the 6th and Van Argeno in Blood+, the main protagonist Baldur in Silicon Knights's Too Human, Breakdown in Transformers: War for Cybertron, the Winter Soldier in Marvel: Ultimate Alliance, and Iron Man in Marvel: Ultimate Alliance 2.

Freeman teaches classes, workshops, and performance lectures in the Los Angeles area.  In addition to classes, Freeman has a website called Voice Acting Mastery which includes podcasts and other resources regarding voice acting.

In February 2023, Freeman guest voiced Lieutenant Nolan, an Imperial lieutenant with particular disdain for clones, the commanding officer of Crosshair, in Star Wars: The Bad Batch.

Filmography

Anime

Animation

Films

Video games

Other dubbing

Live-action

References

Interviews
 Crispin Freeman Interview at RPGSite
 Crispin Freeman: Q and A  at The Anime Lodge
 "A Very Different Place" - A Crispin Freeman Interview part one
 "A Very Different Place" - A Crispin Freeman Interview part two including audio
 "Anime Today Episode 31" - Crispin Freeman Interview
 'Kana's Korner' Interview on 91.8 The Fan

External links

 
 Voice Acting Mastery - Crispin Freeman's voice acting podcast blog
 Mythology and Meaning - Crispin Freeman's website for his lectures on anime
 
 
 Crispin Freeman at Crystal Acids Voice Actor Database
 

20th-century American male actors
20th-century American writers
21st-century American male actors
21st-century American writers
American male film actors
American male television actors
American male voice actors
American male video game actors
American television writers
American male screenwriters
Columbia University School of the Arts alumni
Latin School of Chicago alumni
Living people
Male actors from Chicago
Male actors from Los Angeles
Male actors from New York City
American male television writers
People from Chicago
People from Los Angeles
American voice directors
Williams College alumni
Writers from Chicago
Writers from Los Angeles
Writers from New York City
20th-century American male writers
Screenwriters from New York (state)
Screenwriters from California
Screenwriters from Illinois
Year of birth missing (living people)